The qualification process for the 2027 FIFA Women's World Cup will determine all 32 teams playing for the Women's World Cup, with the host(s) to be appointed by the FIFA Congress in the second quarter of 2024 qualifying automatically. It is scheduled to be the tenth FIFA Women's World Cup, the quadrennial international women's football world championship tournament.

Qualified teams

Qualification process

Summary of qualification
Qualifying matches are scheduled to start in 2025 and end in 2027.

Apart from the host(s), most of the 209 FIFA member associations could qualify through their own confederation's qualifying process if they choose to enter. The only exception may be Russia. The country is under suspension by FIFA and UEFA from all competitions since 28 February 2022 for invading Ukraine four days earlier.

 H: Hosts

References

2027
Fifa
Fifa
Fifa Women's